The 2012 Newcastle-under-Lyme Borough Council election took place on 3 May 2012 to elect members of Newcastle-under-Lyme Council in England. This was on the same day as other 2012 United Kingdom local elections.

Election result

Ward results
Spoilt votes not included below.

Audley & Bignall End ward

Bradwell ward

Butt Lane ward

Chesterton ward

Clayton ward

Cross Heath ward

Halmer End ward

Holditch ward

Kidsgrove ward

Loggerheads & Whitmore ward

May Bank ward

Newchapel ward

Porthill ward

Ravenscliffe ward

Seabridge ward

Talke ward

Thistleberry ward

Town ward

Westlands ward

Wolstanton ward

References

2012 English local elections
2012
2010s in Staffordshire